Charles Augustus Bennet, 6th Earl of Tankerville PC (10 January 1810 – 18 December 1899), styled Lord Ossulston between 1822 and 1859, was a British peer and Conservative politician. He served as Captain of the Honourable Corps of Gentlemen-at-Arms between 1866 and 1867 and as Lord Steward of the Household between 1867 and 1868.

Background and education
Bennet was born at Charles Street, Berkeley Square, London, the eldest son of Charles Bennet, 5th Earl of Tankerville and Armandine Corisande de Gramont, daughter of the French duke of Gramont and duke of Guiche. He was educated at Harrow and Christ Church, Oxford. He became known by the courtesy title Lord Ossulston on the death of his grandfather in 1822.

Political career
Lord Ossulston entered Parliament as Member of Parliament for North Northumberland in 1832. He held this seat until 1859, when he was summoned to the House of Lords through a writ of acceleration in his father's barony of Ossulston. He succeeded his father in the earldom only a month later. On 8 March 1833, he was appointed a deputy lieutenant of Northumberland. He served under the Earl of Derby as Captain of the Honourable Corps of Gentlemen-at-Arms from 1866 to 1867 and under Derby and then Benjamin Disraeli as Lord Steward of the Household from 1867 to 1868. In 1866 he was sworn of the Privy Council.

Family
Lord Tankerville married Lady Olivia Montagu (18 July 1830 – 15 February 1922), eldest daughter of George Montagu, 6th Duke of Manchester, at Kimbolton Castle, Huntingdonshire, on 29 January 1850. They had five children:

Charles Bennett, Lord Ossulston (31 December 1850, d. 29 June 1879); he died of cholera in India at the age of twenty-eight. He entered the Coldstream Guards as an ensign and lieutenant by purchase in 1870, and exchanged to the Rifle Brigade as a lieutenant in 1873. 
George Montagu Bennet, 7th Earl of Tankerville (30 March 1852 – 9 July 1931); he married Leonora van Marter  on 23 October 1895. They had four children, four grandchildren and seven great-grandchildren. 
Hon. Frederick Augustus (30 May 1853 – 5 September 1891), died unmarried.
Lady Corisande Olivia (1855-11 January 1941), died unmarried.
Lady Ida Louise (22 June 1857 – 24 November 1887); she married John Ramsay, 13th Earl of Dalhousie on 6 December 1877. They had five sons.

Lord Tankerville died at the family seat of Chillingham Castle, Northumberland, in December 1899, aged 89, and was succeeded by his second but only surviving son, George. The Countess of Tankerville died at Greystones, Tunbridge Wells, Kent, on 15 February 1922, aged 91, and was interred at Chillingham on 20 February 1922.

References

External links 
 

1810 births
1899 deaths
People educated at Harrow School
Alumni of Christ Church, Oxford
Earls in the Peerage of Great Britain
Members of the Privy Council of the United Kingdom
Conservative Party (UK) MPs for English constituencies
Bennet, Charles Augustus
Bennet, Charles Augustus
Bennet, Charles Augustus
Bennet, Charles Augustus
Bennet, Charles Augustus
Bennet, Charles Augustus
Bennet, Charles Augustus
UK MPs who inherited peerages
Honourable Corps of Gentlemen at Arms
Deputy Lieutenants of Northumberland